Qeshlaq-e Owrtadagh-e Esmail (also Romanized as Qeshlāq-e Owrtādāgh-e Esmāʿīl; also known as Qeshlāq-e Gowmīr Chīnlū-ye Owrtādāgh and Qeshlāq-e Owrtādāgh) is a village in Qeshlaq-e Jonubi Rural District, Qeshlaq Dasht District, Bileh Savar County, Ardabil Province, Iran. At the 2006 census, its population was 66, in 17 families.

References 

Towns and villages in Bileh Savar County